Phyllocnistis finitima is a moth of the family Gracillariidae, known from Arizona, U.S.A. The hostplant for the species is Senecio cruentus.

References

Phyllocnistis
Endemic fauna of Arizona